Daphnis hypothous, the jade hawkmoth, is a moth of the family Sphingidae described by Pieter Cramer in 1780. It is known from Sri Lanka, southern and northern India, Nepal, Myanmar, southern China, Taiwan, Thailand, Malaysia, and Indonesia. It is a rare vagrant to the Western Palaearctic realm. During the last hundred years a number have been discovered within the Middle East and one was even found in Scotland late in the 20th century but this was probably imported as a pupa with cargo.

Description
The wingspan is 86–120 mm. It is a very fast flyer and is attracted to both sweet-smelling flowers and light. It differs from Daphnis nerii in having the head and collar uniformly dark purplish brown. Thorax and first two abdominal segments are dark green with a white fringe to the first segment. Other abdominal segments are dark olive green with the streaks and spots as in D. nerii.

Wings are similar to D. nerii but very much darker on both dorsal and ventral side. A white spot is present at the apex of forewing and at the end of cell of forewing ventral side.

Larva is green with yellow dots at its sides. There is a dark dorsal line, a subdorsal purple-red band, edged with yellow on thoracic somites and a blue ocellus on the third somite. Horn is purplish brown with white tubercles. Before changing to pupa, the larva becomes blotched with dark red.

Larvae have been recorded feeding on Rubiaceae species, including Cinchona, Wendlandia and Uncaria species in India. Most instars are green with a brown backward-curving tailhorn and a pair of white or red and yellow dorso-lateral stripes. Some instars have various coloured markings along the sides, including a blue eyespot on each side of the metathorax. The final instar is reddish brown.

Caterpillars can be found on Breonia, Cinchona, Ixora, Pavetta, Uncaria, Wendlandia and Alstonia plants.

Subspecies
Daphnis hypothous hypothous (Indonesia including the Andaman Islands and Seram)
Daphnis hypothous crameri Eitschberger & Melichar, 2010 (South and South-East Asia)

Gallery

Related species
Daphnis nerii, white spot is absent at the apex of forewing.

References

External links
Daphnis hypothous hypothous Sphingidae of the Eastern Palaearctic

Daphnis (moth)
Moths described in 1780
Moths of Japan